This is a list of members of the Victorian Legislative Assembly, from the elections of 1 November 1900 to the elections of 1 October 1902. From 1889 there were 95 seats in the Assembly.
 
Several members resigned to take up seats in the first Australian Parliament.

Victoria was a British self-governing colony in Australia until 1901 when it became a state of Australia.

Note: the Start and End dates refer to the politician's term for that seat. 

Francis Mason was Speaker. William Beazley was Chairman of Committees.

 Anderson died 20 June 1901; replaced by John Deegan in July 1901.
 Best resigned in May 1901 after being elected a senator in the new Australian Parliament; replaced by Patrick O'Connor in June 1901.
 Findley was expelled in June 1901 for seditious libel; replaced by James Boyd in July 1901.
 Isaacs resigned in May 1901 after being elected to the new Australian Parliament; replaced by Alfred Billson in June 1901.
 Kennedy resigned in May 1901 after being elected to the new Australian Parliament; replaced by William Hall in June 1901.
 McColl resigned in May 1901 after being elected to the new Australian Parliament; replaced by John Cullen in June 1901.
 McLean resigned in May 1901 after being elected to the new Australian Parliament; replaced by Hubert Patrick Keogh in June 1901.
 Mauger resigned in May 1901 after being elected to the new Australian Parliament; replaced by Jacob Fotheringham in June 1901.
 Salmon resigned in May 1901 after being elected to the new Australian Parliament; replaced by George Mitchell in June 1901.
 Staughton Sr. died 29 August 1901; replaced by Samuel Staughton Jr. in September 1901.
 Turner resigned in February 1901 to (successfully) contest a seat in the new Australian Parliament; replaced by William Williams in February 1901.
 Fotheringham resigned on 1 May 1902; replaced by Alexander McDonald on 1 June 1902.

References

Members of the Parliament of Victoria by term
20th-century Australian politicians
19th-century Australian politicians